Qualification for the 1997 FIBA European Championship, commonly called FIBA EuroBasket 1997 took place between 24 May 1995 and 26 February 1997. A total of fourteen teams qualified for the tournament, joining hosts Spain and European Champions Yugoslavia.

Format
A total of 43 teams participated. Competition consisted of two stages:

A qualifying round that consisted of nineteen teams divided in three round-robin tournament that took place in Birmingham-England, Kavadarci-Republic of Macedonia and Lugano Switzerland between 22 May and 28 May 1995.
A Semi-Final round where the first and second teams from each of the three groups from the qualifying round joined another twenty-four teams. All thirty teams where then divided in five round-robin groups of six teams each. This stage took place between 8 October 1995 and 26 February 1997 and competition consisted of home and away legs, taking place in each of the participating countries. The top two teams from each group plus the best four third-placed teams qualified for EuroBasket 1997.

Qualifying round

Group A (Birmingham, England)

|}

Group B (Kavadarci, Republic of Macedonia)

|}
Rules=1) Points; 2) Head-to-head results; 3) Points difference; 4) Points scored.

Group C (Lugano, Switzerland)

|}

Semi-final round

Group A

|}

Group B

|}

Group C

|}

Group D

|}

Group E

|}

References

External links

qualification
1995–96 in European basketball
1996–97 in European basketball
1997–98 in European basketball
1997